"The Attack" is the fifth television play episode of the second season of the Australian anthology television series Australian Playhouse. "The Attack" originally aired on ABC on 17 July 1967 in Melbourne, on 24 July 1967 in Brisbane, and on 21 August 1967 in Sydney.

Plot
In a civil war the loyalties of Yvette are put to the test - and she is forced to decide between the man she loves and her country.

Cast
 Anne Charleston as Yvette
 Brian James
 Jeffrey Hodgson as Joe Lawson
 Tellford Jackson as Sam Parker
 George Mallaby

References

External links
 
 

1967 television plays
1967 Australian television episodes
1960s Australian television plays
Australian Playhouse (season 2) episodes